or  is a lake in Narvik Municipality in Nordland county, Norway. The Elvegårdsmoen military camp lies just west of the lake.

See also
List of lakes in Norway

References

Narvik
Lakes of Nordland